Consumers United for Evidence-based Healthcare (CUE) is a coalition of health advocacy consumer groups interested in evidence-based healthcare. It was formed in 2003.

CUE provides leadership to other efforts aimed at involving patients in the research process, strengthening the voice of consumers in healthcare research, which has been called for over two decades but which has not always been successfully implemented free of commercial influence. By creating opportunities for networking and learning, similar to those available to health professionals, CUE members can be empowered and have an ongoing source of information and tools about health issues of concern. This would, at least in theory, give the member groups an edge in advocacy activities.

Since its establishment, CUE members have been asked to testify on national committees, contribute letters to the biomedical literature, sit on national professional society steering groups and advisory panels and many other contributions.

CUE member organizations
As a condition of membership, CUE members may not receive the majority of their funding from commercial sources. All CUE members agree at the time of membership application to attend an annual CUE meeting to set priorities, receive training, and collaborate with other consumer and health advocates throughout the United States. CUE membership is currently about 50 member groups; the earliest members include the National Breast Cancer Coalition, Consumer Reports, and the Black Women's Health Imperative, among others. 
Annie Appleseed Project
Association of Cancer Patient Educators
Black Women's Health Alliance
Black Women's Health Imperative
California Breast Cancer Organizations (CABCO)
Celiac Disease Foundation
Center for Science in the Public Interest
Centering Healthcare Institute
Cherab Foundation
Childbirth Connection Programs of the Partnership for Women and Families
Children With Diabetes Foundation
Citizens for Patient Safety
Connecticut Center for Patient Safety
Consumer Reports
Faces and Voices of Recovery
Families USA
Hepatitis B Initiative of Washington D.C.
Homebirth Summit Consumer Engagement Task Force
Lamaze International
LymeDisease.org
Maine Coalition to Fight Prostate Cancer
MedShadow Foundation
Mothers Against Medical Error
National Alliance for Caregiving
National Breast Cancer Coalition
National Center for Health Research
National Center for Transgender Equality
National Committee to Preserve Social Security and Medicare
National Consumers League
National Council on Aging
National Environmental Education Foundation
National LGBT Cancer Network
National Mental Health Consumers' Self-Help Clearinghouse
National Women's Health Network
Nueva Vida
Our Bodies Ourselves
Ovarian Cancer Advocacy Alliance of San Diego
Patient Safety America
Philadelphia Ujima
Rhode Island Breast Cancer Coalition
SafeMinds
SCAD Alliance
TMJ Association
VHL Alliance
Washington Advocates for Patient Safety
Young Survival Coalition

Conferences and training
CUE has hosted three Summit conferences, in 2007, 2010 and 2017, attended by health advocacy organizations and other key stakeholder groups. CUE also holds an annual membership meeting in Washington, DC and disseminates slidecasts from the meeting to the public. Past speakers have included:
Robert Califf (Commissioner of the Food and Drug Administration from 2016-2017)
Vinay Prasad (Physician, Author of Ending Medical Reversal: Improving Outcomes, Saving Lives)
Deborah Zarin (Current Director of ClinicalTrials.gov)
Diana Zuckerman (President of the National Center for Health Research and The Cancer Prevention and Treatment Fund)

All of CUE's training materials are available free of charge to the public. CUE has produced these materials with the input of patients, consumers, guideline developers, and health professionals. The resources available on the CUE website are as follows:
Free Cochrane Courses
Understanding Evidence-based Healthcare: A Foundation for Action
The FDA and the Regulation of Healthcare Interventions
CLEO - Conversations, Learning, Evidence, Opportunities
Curated resource library of free online media
Consumer Involvement in Guideline Development: Why and how to participate
Series I: Introduction to participation on advisory panels
Series II: Case studies on consumer engagement on advisory panels
Self-tests accompany each video
Pocket cards for consumers and panel organizers summarize key points
Series III: Scenarios exploring the interpersonal dynamics of advisory panel participation
Self-tests accompany each video
Pocket cards for consumers and panel organizers summarize key points
Series IV: How to communicate effectively on an advisory panel
Pocket card for consumers and panel organizers summarize key points

CUE also hosts social networking through Facebook groups and Twitter, and contributes its views and support to international projects such as AllTrials.

CUE Partnership Clearinghouse
In keeping with its role as a consumer-scientist partnership, CUE maintains a clearinghouse function which matches consumers with healthcare professional organizations so that the consumer voice may be incorporated into important healthcare decisions. Past partnerships have matched consumer representatives into research implementation processes such as clinical guidelines panels, grant-writing, peer review, and conference workshops.

Through the CUE Clearinghouse, health professional organizations can request consumer representatives for their research/research implementation projects and consumers can respond directly to those requests. Since 2007, CUE has fostered over 75 partnerships between consumers and policymaking organizations, including 12 in 2014 alone.
 
In order to prepare all stakeholders for a panel with meaningful consumer engagement, CUE has created a series of short videos based on real-life interactions between professionals and patients participating on advisory panels. These videos demonstrate real-life scenarios and situations that professional guideline developers and consumer advocates serving on advisory panels are likely to encounter. They focus on specific steps in the advisory panel process such as preparing for a panel as a consumer, effectively moderating the panel as a Chair, and how to ensure that diverse opinions are heard, understood, and respected during advisory panel meetings.

See also
Decision-making
Evidence-based medicine
Policy-based evidence making

References

External links

Resources for Serving on an Advisory Panel

Medical and health organizations based in Maryland
Evidence-based medicine